The Robillard Building (French: Édifice Robillard) once located at 974, boulevard Saint Laurent (974, Saint Laurent Boulevard), was a landmark building in Montreal, Quebec, Canada, situated in Montreal's Chinatown on the corner of rue Viger (Viger Street) and boulevard Saint Laurent (Saint Laurent Boulevard).  On 17 November 2016, the building was destroyed by fire. Despite being a famous landmark, the Robillard Building did not have a heritage status and was not rebuilt. The site remained empty from 2016 until 2022. As of 2022, a condominium is being built on the site.

History

Constructed in the Neo-Renaissance style, the structure was built in 1879, and transformed into a hotel in 1890. In 1891, it housed the Gaiety Museum and Theatorium, a popular Victorian-era curios showcase. In May 1896, it started housing the Palace Theatre, and on June 27 showed the first movies in North America, making it the first cinema in North America. The cinema system used a projector system developed by the Lumiere brothers, the cinématographe, and had a screen the size of a towel. The first films shown were of a train, a ship, a cavalry charge, and demolishing a wall. The show continued for two months, and were presented by Louis Minier and his assistant Louis Pupier. In September 1896, continuous showings with the cinematographe lumiere started.

References

External links

  La Presse, "Incendie dans le quartier chinois: une enquête criminelle est ouverte" (17 November 2016) Hugo Meunier, Pierre-Andre Normandin
 Montreal Gazette, "Major fire destroys historic building in downtown Montreal's Chinatown" (17 November 2016) Jesse Feith
  Le Journal de Montreal, "Un proprio négligent dénoncé" (18 November 2016) Hugo Duchaine 
  Le Devoir, "La première salle de cinéma du Canada s’envole en fumée" (18 November 2016) Philippe Orfali

1896 establishments in Quebec
1896 in film
Burned buildings and structures in Canada
Commercial buildings completed in 1879
Defunct museums in Canada
Former cinemas in Montreal
Landmarks in Montreal
Museums established in 1891
Museums in Montreal
Renaissance Revival architecture in Canada
Burned theatres
Ville-Marie, Montreal
Buildings and structures demolished in 2016